Athletics competitions have been held at the South Asian Games since the inaugural edition of the South Asian Federation Games in 1984 in Kathmandu, Nepal.

Gold medalists

Men's 100 metres
1984: 
1985: 
1987: 
1989: 
1991: 
1993: 
1995: 
1999: 
2004: 
2006: 
2010: 
2016: 
2019:

Men's 200 metres
1984: 
1985: 
1987: 
1989: 
1991: 
1993: 
1995: 
1999: 
2004: 
2006: 
2010: 
2016: 
2019:

Men's 400 metres
1984: 
1985: 
1987: 
1989: 
1991: 
1993: 
1995: 
1999: 
2004:

Men's 800 metres
1985: 
1987: 
1989: 
1991: 
1993: 
1995: 
1999: 
2004:

Men's 1500 metres
1984: 
1985: 
1987: 
1989: 
1991: 
1993: 
1995: 
1999: 
2004:

Men's 5000 metres
1984: 
1985: 
1987: 
1989: 
1991: 
1993: 
1995: 
1999: 
2004:

Men's 10,000 metres
1984: 
1985: 
1987: 
1989: 
1991: 
1993: 
1995: 
1999: 
2004: Not held

Men's marathon
1984: 
1985: 
1987: 
1989: 
1991: 
1993: 
1995: 
1999: 
2004:

Men's 3000 metres steeplechase
1987: 
1989: 
1991: Not held
1993: 
1995: 
1999: 
2004:

Men's 110 metres hurdles
1985: 
1987: 
1989: 
1991: 
1993: 
1995: 
1999: 
2004:

Men's 400 metres hurdles
1985: 
1987: 
1989: 
1991: 
1993: 
1995: 
1999: 
2004:

Men's high jump
1987: 
1989: 
1991: 
1993: 
1995: Not held
1999: 
2004:

Men's pole vault
1987: 
1989:

Men's long jump
1984: 
1985: 
1987: 
1989: 
1991: 
1993: 
1995: 
1999: 
2004:

Men's triple jump
1984: 
1985: 
1987: 
1989: 
1991: 
1993: 
1995: 
1999: 
2004:

Men's shot put
1984: 
1985: 
1987: 
1989: 
1991: 
1993: 
1995: 
1999: 
2004:

Men's discus throw
1987: 
1989: 
1991: 
1993: 
1995: 
1999: 
2004:

Men's hammer throw
1987: 
1989: 
1991: Not held
1993: 
1995: 
1999: 
2004:

Men's javelin throw
1984: 
1985: 
1987: 
1989: 
1991: 
1993: 
1995: 
1999: 
2004:

Men's 4 × 100 metres relay
1984: 
1985: 
1987: 
1989: 
1991: 
1993: 
1995: 
1999: 
2004:

Men's 4 × 400 metres relay
1984: 
1985: 
1987: 
1989: 
1991: 
1993: 
1995: 
1999: 
2004:

Women's 100 metres
1984: 
1985: 
1987: 
1989: 
1991: 
1993: 
1995: 
1999: 
2004:

Women's 200 metres
1984: 
1985: 
1987: 
1989: 
1991: 
1993: 
1995: 
1999: 
2004:

Women's 400 metres
1984: 
1985: 
1987: 
1989: 
1991: 
1993: 
1995: 
1999: 
2004:

Women's 800 metres
1985: 
1987: 
1989: 
1991: 
1993: 
1995: 
1999: 
2004:

Women's 1500 metres
1987: 
1989: Not held
1991: 
1993: 
1995: 
1999: 
2004:

Women's 3000 metres
1987: 
1989: Not held
1991:

Women's 5000 metres
1995: 
1999:

Women's 10,000 metres
1987: 
1989: Not held
1991: 
1993: 
2019:

Women's marathon
1995: 
1999:

Women's 110 metres hurdles
1987: 
1989: 
1991: 
1993: 
1995: 
1999: 
2004:

Women's 400 metres hurdles
1987: 
1989: Not held
1991: 
1993: Not held
1995:

Women's high jump
1987: 
1989: Not held
1991: 
1993: 
1995: 
1999: 
2004:

Women's long jump
1985: 
1987: 
1989: 
1991: 
1993: 
1995: 
1999: 
2004:

Women's shot put
1985: 
1987: 
1989: 
1991: 
1993: 
1995: 
1999: 
2004:

Women's discus throw
1987: 
1989: 
1991: 
1993: 
1995: 
1999: Not held
2004:

Women's javelin throw
1985: 
1987: 
1989: 
1991: 
1993: Not held
1995: 
1999: 
2004:

Women's 4 × 100 metres relay
1984: 
1985: 
1987: 
1989: 
1991: 
1993: 
1995: 
1999: 
2004:

Women's 4 × 400 metres relay
1984: 
1985: 
1987: 
1989: Not held
1991: 
1993: 
1995: 
1999: 
2004:

References

Champions 1984–2004
South Asian Games. GBR Athletics. Retrieved 2021-01-23.

Gold medalists
 List
South Asian Games